

Origin
McGann is an Irish surname, derived from the Gaelic MagAnnaidh, an Old Irish translation or sept of the Mac Cana clan.

Etymology

The Cana particle is a personal name meaning 'cub/whelp', although some sources claim it is derived from the personal name Annadh. Due to anglicization and Ulster migration the original form Mac Cana has had many variations, such as MagAnnaidh, MacAnna and MacCanna, later anglicized to McGann and McCann. The name became McGann upon Ulster migration to Connaught and became Canny and Canney upon Ulster migration to the south (Leinster and Munster).

Notable people named McGann
 Ambrose McGann, American baseball player
 Andrew J. McGann, American politician and businessman
 Bernie McGann, Australian jazz alto saxophone player
 Brad McGann, New Zealand film director and screenwriter
 Ciarán McGann, Irish hurler from Castlelyons, County Cork
 Dennis Lawrence "Dan" McGann (1871–1910), American baseball player
 Gary McGann (born 1950), Irish businessman
 Jake McGann, English actor
 James McGann (1955–2021), American academic known for research on think tanks
 Jerome McGann (born 1937), American academic and textual scholar
 John R. McGann, American Catholic bishop
 Joseph McGann, British music producer
 Lawrence E. McGann, American politician
 Oisín McGann, Irish writer and illustrator
 Preston McGann, American football player

The McGann acting family consists of four brothers:
 Joe McGann
 Paul McGann 
 Mark McGann
 Stephen McGann

See also
 McGinn
 McCann (surname)
Bryan McGan (1848–1894) Australian cricketer

Macan, John David (1997) MacCana of Clanbrassil an ancestral and family history, Published by John Macan, Queensland. 

Anglicised Irish-language surnames
English-language surnames
Patronymic surnames